This is a list of notable people from the Tajik ethnic group.

Politics 

 Ahmed Shah Massoud, commander and mujahideen in Afghanistan, assassinated by al Qaeda
Rustam Emomali, Mayor of Dushanbe and the eldest son of president Emomali Rahmon
 Emomali Rahmon, current President of Tajikistan
Rahmon Nabiyev, First Secretary of the Communist Party of Tajikistan and two time President of Tajikistan
Jamshed Karimov, former Prime Minister of Tajikistan and a cousin of former President of Uzbekistan Islam Karimov
Kokhir Rasulzoda, current Prime Minister of Tajikistan

Military
Sherali Mirzo, Minister of Defense since November 2013
Emomali Sobirzoda, Chief of the General Staff of the Armed Forces of the Republic of Tajikistan
Negmatullo Kurbanov, Commanding Officer of the Tajik Internal Troops
Abduhalim Nazarzoda, former Deputy Minister of Defense
Latif Fayziyev, Commander of the Tajik Mobile Forces
Saimumin Yatimov, Chairman of the State Committee for National Security
Ramazon Rahimov, Minister of Internal Affairs
Gulmurod Khalimov, lieutenant-colonel when commander of the police special forces of the Interior Ministry of Tajikistan until 2015, he then defected to the Islamic State of Iraq and the Levant

Sports
Sharif Nazarov, football coach
Sherali Dostiev, male boxer
Alisher Chingizov, Tajik swimmer

Business
Rus Yusupov, co-founder of Vine and the co-founder and CEO of HQ Trivia

Entertainment
Malika Kalontarova, Tajik-American actress
Mayram Isoeva
Gulchehra Baqoeva
Bozgul Isoeva, ballet dancer
Katerina Izmailova, 3-time Olympic swimmer

Arts and culture
Zakir Sabirov
Zuhur Habibullaev

Science
Salizhan Sharipov, cosmonaut

See also
 Lists of people by nationality

Tajik
Ethnic Tajik people